Busting Through the Van Allan Belt is the seventh album by Helios Creed, released on April 15, 1994, through Cleopatra Records.

Track listing

Personnel 
Musicians
Helios Creed – vocals, guitar, sampler, percussion, production
Del Dettmar – synthesizer on "Hyperventilation"
Paul Fox – bass guitar on "Hyperventilation"
Tommy Grenas – guitar on "Hyperventilation"
Chris McKay – bass guitar on "Late Bloomer" and "Lactating Purple"
Paul Della Pelle – drums on "Hyperventilation", "Late Bloomer" and "Lactating Purple"
Len Del Rio – keyboards and synthesizer on "Hyperventilation"
Z Sylver – keyboards
Nik Turner – saxophone on "Hyperventilation"
Andrew Weiss – bass guitar on "Drowning Sin" and "Bubble Butt"
Jon Weiss – drums on "Drowning Sin" and "Bubble Butt"
Production and additional personnel
Endless – design

References 

1994 albums
Cleopatra Records albums
Helios Creed albums